Statistics of Kabul Premier League in season 2006.

Overview
Ordu Kabul F.C. won the championship.

Group A
Top three of group A were:

Group B
Top three of group B were:

References
Afghanistan 2006

Kabul Premier League seasons
1
Afghan
Afghan